Coleophora orbata is a moth of the family Coleophoridae.

References

orbata
Moths described in 1988